The Battle of Uddevalla took place at Uddevalla on August 28, 1677 as part of the Scanian War.

Prelude 
After the fall of Marstrand to the Norwegians, Gothenburg had become vulnerably exposed. Magnus Gabriel de la Gardie assembled a force of 3,000 Swedes of which 1,200 were fresh cavalry recruits and 1,500 were impressed Dalecarlians. The force camped at Vänersborg on August 10, and moved from there to Uddevalla. However, a strong Danish-Norwegian force of 5,600 men led by Ulrik Fredrik Gyldenløve was approaching from Norway and caught up with the Swedish force.

The battle 
De la Gardie deployed his troops for a set-piece defence, but the Gyldenløve began flanking the Swedes, attempting to cut off their escape route to the river Göta älv. De la Gardie had to order his cavalry to cover the Swedish infantry's retreat to the river, but when the superior Danish cavalry charged the Swedish cavalry, it ran away without firing a shot. De la Gardie himself was almost captured, and the battle devolved into a disorganized rout (a Danish source described the Swedes "scampering like hares among the rocks"). Only at Kuru Bro, 5 km east of Uddevalla, did the fleeing Swedes make a stand. The Dalecarlians held their positions, their pikes defending the bridge from the attacking cavalry until the Swedish force had crossed, after which the bridge was demolished.

Aftermath 
The Swedish army reached safety behind Göta Älv, but its losses amounted to 500 men and 9 cannons. The outcome of the battle was blamed on the poorly trained Swedish troops and the incompetence of de la Gardie as a military leader. After the battle, he requested and was relieved of his command, with sharp reprimands from the king.

References

 Berättelser ur svenska historien, vol 6, pp 684–685, Carl Georg Starbäck & Per Olof Bäckström (1886)
 Dansk biografisk Lexikon, vol 10, pp 597–598, Carl Frederik Bricka (1905)
 https://www.imago-images.com/st/0072511073

Uddevalla
Uddevalla
1677 in Denmark
History of Bohuslän
Uddevalla
Uddevalla